Shahenda Wafa (born 1998) is an Egyptian chess player who holds the title of Woman Grandmaster (2017). She is a three-time, and the current,  African Women's  Chess Champion (2017, 2018, 2022).

Chess career
Shahenda Wafa won the 2014 Arab Girls Championship and African Girls Championship in age category U16. She was joint winner with Sabrina Latreche of the 2014 Women's Arab Chess Championship. In 2015, she won African Youth and Junior Girls Chess Championships.

Shahenda Wafa twice in row won the Women's African Chess Championship; in 2017 in Oran and in 2018 in Livingstone. She qualified for the Women's World Chess Championship 2018.

Shahenda Wafa played for Egypt in the Women's Chess Olympiads:
 In 2012, at fourth board in the 40th Chess Olympiad (women) in Istanbul (+3, =2, -4),
 In 2014, at fourth board in the 41st Chess Olympiad (women) in Tromsø (+4, =0, -4),
 In 2016, at fourth board in the 42nd Chess Olympiad (women) in Baku (+2, =4, -2), 
 In 2018, at third board in the 43rd Chess Olympiad (women) in Batumi (+6, =1, -3).

Shahenda Wafa played for Egypt in the World Team Chess Championship:
 In 2015, at second board in the 5th Women's World Team Chess Championship 2015 in Chengdu (+1, =0, -8).

In 2013, she was awarded the FIDE Woman International Master (WIM) title and received the FIDE Woman Grandmaster (WGM) title three years later.

Her sister Shrook Wafa also is a Woman Grandmaster.

References

External links
 
 
 

1998 births
Living people
Egyptian female chess players
Chess woman grandmasters
Chess Olympiad competitors
African Games medalists in chess
African Games gold medalists for Egypt
African Games silver medalists for Egypt
Competitors at the 2019 African Games
21st-century Egyptian women